Niall Geary (born 1975) is an Irish retired Gaelic footballer who played for club sides Tramore and Nemo Rangers, at inter-county level with the Waterford and Cork senior football teams and with Munster.

Career

Geary began his Gaelic football career with Tramore, with whom he had minor and under-21 championship successes. He simultaneously came to prominence on the inter-county scene with the Waterford minor and under-21 teams before making his senior championship debut in 1996. A move to Cork saw Geary transfer to the Nemo Rangers club and he had a number successes with his adopted club. These included seven County Senior Championship medals in nine seasons between 2000 and 2008, and he was also a part of the club's All-Ireland Club Championship-winning team in 2003. Geary also lined out with the Cork senior football team and won a Munster Championship medal as a substitute in 2002.

Honours

Tramore
Waterford Under-21 Football Championship: 1994, 1995
Waterford Minor Football Championship: 1993

Nemo Rangers
All-Ireland Senior Club Football Championship: 2003
Munster Senior Club Football Championship: 2000, 2001, 2002, 2005, 2007 (c)
Cork Senior Football Championship: 2000, 2001, 2002, 2005, 2006, 2007 (c), 2008

Cork
Munster Senior Football Championship: 2002

References

1975 births
Living people
Nemo Rangers Gaelic footballers
Waterford inter-county Gaelic footballers
Cork inter-county Gaelic footballers
Munster inter-provincial Gaelic footballers